The 1935 North Carolina Tar Heels football team represented the University of North Carolina at Chapel Hill during the 1935 college football season. The Tar Heels were led by second-year head coach Carl Snavely and played their home games at Kenan Memorial Stadium. They competed as a member of the Southern Conference. Snavely unexpectedly resigned at the end of the season to accept a head coaching position at Cornell University. He returned to coach the Tar Heels again from 1945 to 1952.

Schedule

References

North Carolina
North Carolina Tar Heels football seasons
North Carolina Tar Heels football